Phil Hill or Philip Hill or Phillip Hill may refer to:

Philip Carteret Hill (18211894), Premier of Nova Scotia
Phil Hill (19272008), American racing driver, Formula One champion in 1961
Phillip E. Hill Sr. (born 1956), American ringleader of a mortgage fraud scheme in the State of Georgia
Phillip Hill (born 1972), American pop punk bass guitar player
Phil Hill (ice hockey) (born 1982), Welsh ice hockey player

See also 
 Phillips Hill, Delaware, an unincorporated community
 
 
 
 Hill (surname)